Route 7 is a numbered state highway in Rhode Island, United States.

Route description
Route 7 begins in Providence at an intersection with Route 246, carrying Orms Street in a western direction.  As it passes over I-95, the route meets Douglas Avenue and turns onto it, flanking a residential area.  It then enters North Providence and continues for another , exiting the residential area at Wenscott Reservoir and entering Smithfield.  On the reservoir, Route 7 crosses a causeway, becoming the Douglas Pike and retaining that name through the township.  The road passes through a heavily wooded area, serving several homes in the area.  It expands to four lanes for a short while as it features an interchange with I-295, passing by a shopping center and also intersecting Route 116.  North of there, after thinning to two lanes once more, it intersects both Routes 5 and 104, forming a short concurrency with them as they cross each other in North Smithfield.  The road continues north to Burrillville, passing through Nasonville, where it makes a right turn and momentarily changes name to Victory Highway; however, that road leaves at the very next intersection.  As Douglas Turnpike again, the route crosses Route 102 and continues north to Joslin Road.

The northern terminus of Route 7 is at Joslin Road because that is where state maintenance on the road ends.  The paved road continues to the Massachusetts state line. The numbered route does not cross the stateline, but does continue as "Douglas Pike" through the SW corner of Uxbridge, crossing Massachusetts Route 98 and continuing to the center of Douglas.

Major intersections

See also

References

External links
2019 Highway Map, Rhode Island

007
Transportation in Providence County, Rhode Island